Australia sent a team of 12 athletes and three guides to the  2018 Winter Paralympics in PyeongChang, Korea. Australia finished 15th on the medal table and it was its fourth best medal performance at the Winter Paralympics.

Medallists

Team Preparation
It was expected that the final Australian team would be between 10 and 12 athletes across two sports – para-alpine skiing and para-snowboard. There is the aim to finish in the top 15 nations on the medal table, as per the target set by the Australian Sports Commission’s Australia’s Winning Edge policy. The team will be missing previous Winter Paralympic Games medallists - Cameron Rahles-Rahbula, Toby Kane and Jessica Gallagher.

The Australian Paralympic Committee expects Mitchell Gourley, Melissa Perrine, Joany Badenhorst and Ben Tudhope to be medal contenders.

The Australian Sports Commission provided Ski and Snowboard Australia the following funding for Australia's Winter Paralympic high performance program:
2014/15 = $934,478:  2015/16  - $934,478;  2016/17 - $934,478;  2017/18 - $1,009,478

Administration

In March 2017, Nick Dean was appointed Chef de Mission. He previously served as Chef de Mission at the Lillehammer 1994, Nagano 1998 and Salt Lake City 2002 Games and was Deputy Chef de Mission for a further three Winter and two Summer Paralympic Games between 1992 and 2012.

Team

Mitchell Gourley and Joany Badenhorst were announced team co-captains in October 2017.
On 20 February 2018, Australian Paralympic Committee announced a team of 13 athletes. Shaun Pianta and sighted guide Jeremy O'Sullivan were selected in the team on 6 March but Pianta will be required to pass  a final fitness test on his injured right knee ahead of his Paralympic debut on March 14.

The final team of 12 athletes and three sighted guides is the largest Australian team to compete at a Winter Paralympic Games.

Joany Badenhorst was named the Opening Ceremony flag bearer, the first female Australian Winter Paralympian to  be given this honour. Melissa Perrine was given the honour of the  Closing Ceremony flag bearer due to her competing at three Winter Games and winning two bronze medals in PyeongChang.

Events

Alpine skiing
Women

Men

Snowboarding
Women

Joany Badenhorst was injured in a training run just prior to the day of competition and was declared medically unfit to compete.
Men

Men

Media Coverage
Seven Network has an agreement with the Australian Paralympic Committee to provide coverage of Australia’s Winter Paralympic sport across Seven’s television, digital and print media assets to bring the stories of Australia’s winter Paralympic athletes to more Australians than ever before. Coverage will include a daily highlights show to be broadcast on 7MATE every morning, with an encore highlights on 7TWO and Channel 7 in the evening. It is the first time a commercial television network has covered Australian athletes at the Winter Paralympics. During the Games, Channel Seven encountered criticism from former Paralympians and current athletes due to it limiting its coverage of the nine-day event to a one-hour highlights show the day after competition for Australian audiences.

See also
 Images of Australian Team at the 2018 Winter Paralympics

References

External links
APC 2018 Winter Games Media Guide 
 PyeongChang Official website 
International Paralympic Committee PyeongChang website

Nations at the 2018 Winter Paralympics
2018
Paralympics